The women's 58 kg taekwondo competition at the 2020 Summer Paralympics was held on 3 September 2021 at the Makuhari Messe Hall B.

Results

Bracket

Repechage

References

External links
Draw Sheet 

Women's 58 kg